"Learnalilgivinanlovin" is a song by the Belgian-Australian singer-songwriter Gotye from his second album Like Drawing Blood released in Australia as a single in 2006. A new version of the song (with the chorus sung in a higher pitch) was released as a single in Belgium in 2008.

Background
The song draws very heavy influence from Motown records of the late '50s and early '60s such as Marvin Gaye and Smokey Robinson and The Miracles. Gotye uses a drum sample from The Ronettes' record, "Be My Baby" (which famously employs Phil Spector's Wall of Sound technique).

Music video
A music video to accompany the Australian version of "Learnalilgivinanlovin" was first released onto YouTube on 6 December 2007.

Track listing
Digital download
 "Learnalilgivinanlovin" (Passion Pit Mix) – 4:35

Australian CD single
 "Learnalilgivinanlovin" – 2:50
 "Seven Hours with a Backseat Driver" – 4:44

Chart performance

In popular culture 

The song was used in episode 3 of season 1 of the Australian TV series, Packed to the Rafters.

The song also appeared in the film Whip It, as well as on the soundtrack.

References

2006 singles
Gotye songs
Songs written by Gotye